Rosenbergia ehrmanae is a species of beetle in the family Cerambycidae. It was described by Rigout in 1983.

References

Batocerini
Beetles described in 1983